Tonti Township is located in Marion County, Illinois. As of the 2010 census, its population was 1,013 and it contained 430 housing units.

History
Tonti Township was named in honor of Henry de Tonti, an early Italian/French explorer of Illinois.

Geography 
Tonti Township (T3N R2E) is centered at 38°41'N 88°58'W (88.691,-88.975). It is transversed northeast–south by Interstate Route 57 and State Route 37. Part of the Salem Reservoir (El. 166 m) is located at the southeastern part of the township.

Demographics

Adjacent townships 
 Foster Township (north)
 Kinmundy Township (northeast)
 Omega Township (east)
 Stevenson Township (southeast)
 Salem Township (south)
 Odin Township (southwest)
 Carrigan Township (west)
 Patoka Township (northwest)

References

External links
US Census
City-data.com
Illinois State Archives

Townships in Marion County, Illinois
Townships in Illinois